Marian Costea (born June 13, 1952) is a former Romanian ice hockey player. He played for the Romanian national team at the 1976 Winter Olympics in Innsbruck, and the 1980 Winter Olympics in Lake Placid.

References

1952 births
Living people
Ice hockey players at the 1976 Winter Olympics
Ice hockey players at the 1980 Winter Olympics
Olympic ice hockey players of Romania
Romanian ice hockey right wingers
Sportspeople from Bucharest